Emlenton is a borough in Clarion and Venango counties in the U.S. state of Pennsylvania. The population was 625 at the 2010 census. Of these, 617 were in Venango County, and eight were in Clarion County. The borough is home to the Emlenton Bridge on I-80, which spans the Allegheny River.

History
Emlenton is named for Emlen, the wife of John T. Sherer, one of its founders.

The Emlenton Historic District was added to the National Register of Historic Places in 1997.

Geography

Demographics

As of the census of 2000, there were 784 people, 322 households, and 200 families residing in the borough. The population density was 947.1 people per square mile (364.7/km2). There were 360 housing units at an average density of 434.9 per square mile (167.5/km2). The racial makeup of the borough was 98.85% White, 0.26% Native American, 0.38% Asian, and 0.51% from two or more races.

There were 322 households, out of which 29.2% had children under the age of 18 living with them, 45.3% were married couples living together, 12.7% had a female householder with no husband present, and 37.6% were non-families. 35.4% of all households were made up of individuals, and 17.7% had someone living alone who was 65 years of age or older. The average household size was 2.30 and the average family size was 2.94.

In the borough the population was spread out, with 23.5% under the age of 18, 7.0% from 18 to 24, 23.3% from 25 to 44, 22.7% from 45 to 64, and 23.5% who were 65 years of age or older. The median age was 42 years. For every 100 females there were 77.8 males. For every 100 females age 18 and over, there were 77.5 males.

The median income for a household in the borough was $30,227, and the median income for a family was $40,893. Males had a median income of $33,125 versus $21,875 for females. The per capita income for the borough was $16,952. About 10.7% of families and 15.1% of the population were below the poverty line, including 19.0% of those under age 18 and 11.4% of those age 65 or over.

See also
East Brady, Pennsylvania
Foxburg, Pennsylvania
Parker, Pennsylvania

References

External links

Emlenton Summer Festival

 

Boroughs in Venango County, Pennsylvania
Populated places established in 1820
1859 establishments in Pennsylvania
Boroughs in Clarion County, Pennsylvania